EL-DE Haus, officially the  NS Documentation Center of the City of Cologne, located in Cologne, is the former headquarters of the Gestapo and now a museum documenting the Third Reich.

The building was at first the business premises of jeweller Leopold Dahmen, and the building takes its name from his initials. In 1934, the Nazis rented the building from him and turned it into the headquarters of the secret police, the Gestapo. Surprisingly, the building survived the Allied bombing of Cologne during World War II, while 90% of the city was destroyed. After the bombings, the basements of the building, which had been used as prison cells and torture rooms for forced labourers and political enemies, were used to store wartime files and paperwork.  Inscriptions made on the walls of the prison cells by inmates can still be viewed today.  The building was the site of many executions, as well as deaths due to overcrowding and poor hygienic conditions.

In 2006, the Documentation Centre on National Socialism was awarded the Best in Heritage award, which is given to select museums. The only other German museum to have won the prize is the Buddenbrook Museum in Lübeck.

EL-DE Haus Gallery

References

External links
 
Official website 
Martens, Josefa: Cologne Museum Sheds Light on Nazi Era from Deutsche Welle. Retrieved 12 March 2006.

Museums in Cologne
Buildings and structures in Cologne
World War II museums in Germany
Gestapo